Waverly High School may refer to:

United States
Waverly High School (Illinois), Waverly, Illinois
Waverly High School (Kansas), Waverly, Kansas
Waverly Senior High School, Lansing, Michigan
Waverly High School (Nebraska), Waverly, Nebraska
Waverly Junior and Senior High School, Waverly, Tioga County, New York
Waverly High School (Ohio), Waverly, Ohio
Waverly High School (South Dakota), Waverly, Codington County, South Dakota
Waverly Central High School, Waverly, Tennessee

Elsewhere
Waverley High School, Australia, Glen Waverley, Melbourne, Australia
Waverley High School, New Zealand, Taranaki Region, New Zealand

See also
New Waverly High School, New Waverly, Texas
Waverly-Shell Rock Senior High School, Waverly, Iowa
Howard Lake-Waverly-Winsted High School, Howard Lake, Minnesota